Cinepix was a South Korean 3-D animation company headquartered in Seoul. Cinepix created AquaKids and Cubix: Robots for Everyone.

External links
 Cinepix homepage
 Cinepix - Korea Culture and Content Agency

South Korean animation studios
Mass media in Seoul
Mass media companies established in 1997